Marcos Patronelli (born 1 February 1980) is an Argentine rally raid driver (quad), three-times winner the Dakar Rally (quads). Brother of the two-times winner Alejandro Patronelli.

Dakar Rally

References

External links 
 Driver profile at WorldRallyRaid

1980 births
Living people
Dakar Rally drivers
Argentine motorcycle racers
Enduro riders
Dakar Rally winning drivers
Off-road motorcycle racers